Indotestudo is a genus of tortoise from South and Southeast Asia. in the family Testudinidae. The three species in the genus are all threatened.

Species
It contains the following species:

References

 Alderton, D. 1988. Turtles and tortoises of the world. Facts on File, New York.
 Blyth, E. 1854. Notices and descriptions of various reptiles, new or little-known. Part I. J. Asiat. Soc. Bengal 22 [1853]: 639-655
 Bour, R. 1980. Essai sur la taxinomie des Testudinidae actuels (Reptilia, Chelonii). Bull. Mus. natl. Hist. nat. Paris (4) 2 (2): 541-546
 Chan-ard,T.; Grossmann, W.; Gumprecht, A. & Schulz, K. D. 1999. Amphibians and reptiles of peninsular Malaysia and Thailand - an illustrated checklist [bilingual English and German]. Bushmaster Publications, Würselen, Germany, 240 pp.
 Cox, Merel J.; Van Dijk, Peter Paul; Jarujin Nabhitabhata & Thirakhupt, Kumthorn 1998. A Photographic Guide to Snakes and Other Reptiles of Peninsular Malaysia, Singapore and Thailand. Ralph Curtis Publishing, 144 pp.
 Das, I. 2008. Tortoises and Freshwater Turtles of India. WWF/WII poster

 
Turtle genera
Taxa named by Wassili Adolfovitch Lindholm